The 1984 NCAA Division I Cross Country Championships were the 46th annual NCAA Men's Division I Cross Country Championship and the 4th annual NCAA Women's Division I Cross Country Championship to determine the team and individual national champions of NCAA Division I men's and women's collegiate cross country running in the United States. In all, four different titles were contested: men's and women's individual and team championships.

Held on November 19, 1984, the combined meet was hosted by Penn State University at the Penn State Golf Courses in State College, Pennsylvania. The distance for the men's race was 10 kilometers (6.21 miles) while the distance for the women's race was 5 kilometers (3.11 miles).

The men's team national championship was won by Arkansas, their first national title. The individual championship was won by Ed Eyestone, from BYU, with a time of 29:28.8.

The women's team national championship was won by Wisconsin, their first national title. The individual championship was won by Cathy Branta, from Wisconsin, with a time of 16:15.6.

Qualification
All Division I cross country teams were eligible to qualify for the meet through their placement at various regional qualifying meets. In total, 21 teams and 184 runners contested the men's championship while 16 teams and 133 runners contested the women's title.

Men's title
Distance: 10,000 meters (6.21 miles)

Men's Team Result (Top 10)

Men's Individual Result (Top 10)

Women's title
Distance: 5,000 meters (3.11 miles)

Women's Team Result (Top 10)

Women's Individual Result (Top 10)

See also
NCAA Men's Division II Cross Country Championship 
NCAA Women's Division II Cross Country Championship
NCAA Men's Division III Cross Country Championship
NCAA Women's Division III Cross Country Championship

References
 

NCAA Cross Country Championships
NCAA Division I Cross Country Championships
NCAA Division I Cross Country Championships
NCAA Division I Cross Country Championships
Sports in State College, Pennsylvania
Track and field in Pennsylvania
Pennsylvania State University